William Bernard Lauterborn (June 9, 1879 – April 19, 1965) was an infielder in Major League Baseball. He went to Fordham University.

External links

1879 births
1965 deaths
Baseball players from New York (state)
Major League Baseball second basemen
Major League Baseball third basemen
Boston Beaneaters players
Binghamton Bingoes players
Fordham Rams baseball players
Seattle Siwashes players
Denver Grizzlies (baseball) players
Wilmington Peaches players
Wilkes-Barre Barons (baseball) players
Canton Watchmakers players
Canton Deubers players
East Liverpool Potters (baseball) players
Holland Wooden Shoes players